Ricardo de Albuquerque is a neighborhood in the North Zone of Rio de Janeiro, Brazil. It is close to Irajá and São João do Meriti. There are no beaches in this area.

References

Neighbourhoods in Rio de Janeiro (city)